The Five Rings of Moscow is a road bicycle racing stage race held annually in Moscow, Russia. It was first run in 1993 and since 2005 has been part of the UCI Europe Tour as a 2.2 category race. The most successful riders are Sergey Firsanov, Andrei Ptchelkine and Ivan Terenine, who have two victories each.

Past winners

References

External links

UCI Europe Tour races
Recurring sporting events established in 1993
Cycle races in Russia
1993 establishments in Russia
Sports competitions in Moscow